Gastrotheca ochoai is a species of frog in the family Hemiphractidae. It is endemic to southern Peru and occurs in the interandean valleys on the eastern face of the Andes. The specific name ochoai honors Oscar Ochoa Mendieta, a biology professor from the National University of Saint Anthony the Abbot in Cuzco who helped the species descriptors during the field work. Common name Chilca marsupial frog has been coined for this species.

Description
Adult males measure  and adult females  in snout–vent length. The snout is pointed in dorsal view and round in
profile. The tympanum is round; the supra-tympanic fold is weakly developed and granular. The fingers have no webbing whereas the toes have moderate webbing; the discs are wide and roundly truncate. Dorsal skin has small tubercles. Adults have golden tan coloration with black or brown markings, potentially joining into median or paired stripes. They can, however, change their color to brown, as well as change the intensity of the dorsal patterns. There are narrow, dark brown canthal and post-orbital stripes. The iris is bronze. The venter is dusky white.

The tadpoles metamorphose in their mother's pouch.

Habitat and conservation
The tadpoles develop in bromeliads. It is a very rare species that is threatened by habitat loss (deforestation) caused by subsistence use of wood and timber and by increasing human habitations. It occurs in the Manú National Park.

References

ochoai
Amphibians of the Andes
Amphibians of Peru
Endemic fauna of Peru
Taxa named by William Edward Duellman
Amphibians described in 1972
Taxonomy articles created by Polbot